Andrew Lynch may refer to:

Andrew Burchill Lynch (1941–2001), Canadian publisher
Andrew Lynch (singer-songwriter), American singer-songwriter
Andrew Lynch (mayor) (died 1523), mayor of Galway
Andrew Lynch (jockey), Irish jockey
Andrew Lynch (Australian politician) (1819–1884), New South Wales politician
Andy Lynch (footballer) (born 1951), from Scotland
Andy Lynch (musician), from New Zealand band Zed
Andy Lynch (rugby league) (born 1979), rugby league footballer for Castleford Tigers, Hull FC, Bradford Bulls, England, and Great Britain
Andrew Henry Lynch, Member of the UK Parliament for Galway Borough
 Drew Lynch (born Andrew Lynch, 1991), American comedian